Oles Alekseevich Buzina (13 July 1969 – 16 April 2015) was a  Ukrainian journalist and writer known for his criticism of Ukrainian politics and for the support of closer ties of Ukraine, Belarus, and Russia. 

He was found killed by a gunshot on 16 April 2015, near his residence in Kyiv. The murder case remains unsolved.

Biography
Oles Buzina was born on 13 July 1969 in Kyiv and attended local schools. In 1992 he graduated from the Faculty of Philology Taras Shevchenko National University of Kyiv specialising as a teacher of Russian language and literature. He began a career in journalism working for a number of Ukrainian media outlets:
 Newspaper Kievskiye Vedomosti (1993–2005)
 Newspaper 2000 (2005–2006)
 Various magazines, such as Natali, EGO Ukraine, XXL Ukraine
 From October 2006 Buzina was an anchorman of Teen-liga program on TV channel Inter
 Newspaper Segodnya, where he had his own column and blog since 2007
 As an expert, he participated in the reality-show Bachelor on TV channel STB from 2011
 From 2012 he was host of Po sledam prashurov (In the Footsteps of Ancestors) show on K-1 TV channel.
 In January 2015 he became editor-in-chief of Segodnya newspaper, where he had worked for many years. He resigned in March, protesting the censorship of the newspaper's owners, having limited control over newspaper's policy, his absence of control over newspaper's website, and an imposed ban on his appearance on TV and interviews with the press.
 Buzina founded his own website, featuring blogs and sale of some of his books online.

He was invited as a guest to numerous talk shows in Russia. Some of his articles were published in the Russian media.

As a writer he published eight books, mainly about prominent figures and the history of Ukraine and Russia.

Personal life
Buzina was married and the father of one daughter.

Politics
In addition to his reporting, Buzina tried to enter politics. He ran in the 2012 Ukrainian parliamentary election for a constituency seat in Kyiv for Russian Bloc but failed to win parliamentary representation. In Constituency No. 223, his 8.22% of votes was insufficient.

Political and public views
Buzina held anti-Orange Revolution and anti-Euromaidan views.

On 20 January 2006 he claimed that as a writer he was aware of political censorship in post-Orange Revolution Ukraine, as some publishers were afraid to release his books.

In May 2009 he campaigned for adoption of a series of laws prohibiting neo-Nazi organizations, propaganda of Nazism, and ideological legacy of Organization of Ukrainian Nationalists as a totalitarian fascist party. This initiative was supported by Borys Kolesnikov, one of the leaders of Party of Regions.

In May 2009 National Expert Commission of Ukraine on the Protection of Public Morality launched an investigation against Oles Buzina as a result of complaint filed by Petro Kononenko, director of Institute of Ukrainology. Kononenko stated that Oles Buzina "discredited most outstanding Ukrainian public figures and picks everything that's shameful in our history".

As of April 2009 Buzina was sued 11 times and every single time judges ruled out in his favour. In 2000 he was physically assaulted right after winning in court one of these cases. Some of these legal actions saw Ukrainian politicians as plaintiffs: Pavlo Movchan, Volodymyr Yavorivsky.

On 22 March 2009 he had a cake thrown at him by a FEMEN activist who declared his only fiction book sexist.
Oles Buzina was rated 4th in the "Homophobe of the Year - 2011" list by the Ukrainian gay forum.

He identified himself as both Ukrainian and Russian, though having ethnic Ukrainian parents.

His views on Ukraine expressed on multiple occasions during years of journalism and political commentary included statements that Ukraine should be part of Russia, that it should be a bilingual federal state of Russia and that it should favor an alliance Belarus and Kazakhstan rather than joining the European Union.

His political stance was criticized for a comment to newspaper Den that he gave in 1999: 
He stated that the quote was a fabrication.

Murder
Oles Buzina was found shot on 16 April near his home. Previously, he said on a Russian TV show that he was receiving constant death threats. A previously unknown Ukrainian nationalist group calling itself "Ukrainian Insurgent Army" was reported to claim responsibility for the murders of Buzina and other pro-Russian figures. However, Markian Lubkivskyi, an advisor at the Security Service of Ukraine, said that linguistic analysis of the telephone call indicated they were not native Ukrainian speakers, and head of the Main Investigations Directorate of the Security Service of Ukraine Vasyl Vovk said the organization was fake.

In June Ukrainian authorities arrested three suspects believed to be behind the murder. The head of Ukrainian MIA Arsen Avakov has blamed a Ukrainian nationalist in the murder. All suspects were later released from custody with two (A. Medvedko and D. Polischuk) being placed under house arrest and one - cleared from all the charges. By April 2017 no progress was made in the murder investigation. On 28 November 2017, the case was forwarded from prosecution office into court, even though on 11 July 2016, it was reported a lot of major evidence, including photo robots of the suspects made by eye witnesses, CCTV footage and cell phone monitoring, has been lost from case materials.

Reactions
Russian President Vladimir Putin said on live Russian TV that this murder was a political one and offered his condolences to the family of the victim. Radio Free Europe reported that "At 2:05, Ukrainian presidential adviser Anton Herashchenko confirmed the slaying on Facebook. And by 2:17, Russian President Vladimir Putin was already using Buzina's killing to attack Ukraine's "democratic" values during his annual call-in show with the Russian public," implying that political killings of journalists is a democratic value. The German newspaper Die Zeit reported that the murder of opposition activist Buzina followed a string of murders and deaths of five public figures that were pro-Russian and supportive of the former Ukrainian president Viktor Yanukovych.
Ukrainian officials blamed "Russian special forces assassins" for the murder.

The United Nations High Commissioner for Human Rights Zeid Raad Al Hussein described this murder and others as disturbing and demanded quick and decisive investigation.

EU, Germany, United States, UNESCO, OSCE, Amnesty International have demanded an independent investigation of the murder of Ukrainian journalists Oles Buzina and Serhiy Sukhobok and politician Oleg Kalashnikov.

Investigation 
On 18 June 2015 Minister of the Interior Arsen Avakov announced arrest of two alleged killers, Andrey Medvedko and Denis Polischuk. One of the suspects served in the Kyiv-2 Battalion of the Interior Ministry of Ukraine and was a member of the neo-Nazi group "S14", while the other was a member of the nationalist party Ukrainian National Assembly – Ukrainian People's Self-Defence  (UNA-UNSO); both deny responsibility for the murder.

On 23 June 2015, Polischuk was released on bail after businessman Oleksiy Tamrazov posted his ₴5 million bail. However, on 2 July, the decision was overturned by the Shevchenkovsky District Court of Kyiv, and Polischuk was re-arrested. On 9 December 2015, the Pechersky District Court of Kyiv moved Polishuk to house arrest, ordering him to wear an electronic tagging bracelet. On 31 December 2015, Medvenko was also moved to house arrest under similar conditions. 

On 25 March 2016, the Pechersky District Court of Kyiv released Polischuk from house arrest and released Medvenko on personal obligation. On 23 May, the Court revoked all restrictive measures on Medvenko. 

On 13 May 2016 Buzina's mother, Valentina Buzina, asked the Opposition Bloc (a pro-Russian faction in the Ukrainian parliament) for help, denouncing the unwillingness of Ukrainian authorities to punish her son's killers; MPs from the Bloc promised to send requests to Ukrainian President Petro Poroshenko and Ukraine's Prosecutor General Yuriy Lutsenko so that investigations are carried.

On 28 November 2017, the indictment against Polischuk and Medvenko was sent to the Shevchenkovsky District Court of Kyiv for consideration.

Publications
 Вурдалак Тарас Шевченко (2000), (The Ghoul Taras Shevchenko)
 Тайная история Украины-Руси (2005), (The secret story of Ukraine-Rus')
 Верните женщинам гаремы (2008), (Bring back harems for women)
 Революция на болоте (2010), (Revolution in a swamp)
 Воскрешение Малороссии (2012) (The resurrection of Little Russia)
 Союз плуга и трезуба. Как придумали Украину (2013) (The Union between Plough and Trident. How Ukraine was invented)
 Докиевская Русь (2014) (Rus' before Kievan Rus')

References

External links
 
 Oles Buzina personal blog, on Segodnya, in Russian
 Last interview (Russian language video with English transcript)

1969 births
2015 deaths
Television presenters from Kyiv
Journalists from Kyiv
Politicians from Kyiv
Assassinated Ukrainian journalists
Assassinated Ukrainian politicians
Deaths by firearm in Ukraine
Male journalists
Terrorist incidents in Ukraine
Political violence in Ukraine